Museon is a museum for science and culture in The Hague, Netherlands. It has collections in the domains of geology, biology, archaeology, history, science and ethnology.



Origin

The museum was initiated in 1904 by the newspaper director Frits van Paasschen, who wanted to establish a museum where children could learn about industry. Although science and technology became important domains for the museum, the original idea has never been realized. Under the museum's first director, the geologist Herman van Cappelle, the collection policy moved towards natural history and ethnology.
Van Paasschen's idea of a museum with a strong education mission however was implemented from the very beginning, expressed by the museum's previous name ‘Museum for Education’. From the start the museum organised lessons for school classes, based on the visual tools that are provided by the museum's collection. Around 1910 the museum was also the first organisation in The Netherlands that programmed educational movies, an initiative that led to the foundation of the first school cinema in the country.

Municipal museum
Starting as a private museum the ‘Museum for Education’ was taken over by the municipality of The Hague in 1920.  In 1933, biologist Niko Tinbergen, provided the museum with a collection of objects from the Inuit in Greenland. The museum moved several times, until the municipality had its present building built in 1985, by the design by architect WG Quist. The name Museon also dates from 1985. In 1997 the museum was privatised again.

Mission
Museon hosts educational exhibitions and programmes to communicate with a broad audience. A large part of all visitors are school children. Museon aims at transferring knowledge about man and his relation with nature and culture and provides easily accessible information about topical themes and developments in science and society. Currently the collection counts around 273,000 objects.

2002 Portuguese Crown Jewels theft
In 2002 a large part of the Portuguese Crown Jewels were stolen from the Museon, for which they were on loan for an exhibition on European Crown Jewels. Following an investigation by the museum and Dutch authorities, the Dutch government paid a sum of six million euros to the Portuguese government for reparation.

References

Kockelkorn, Hub. Geschiedenis van het Museum voor het Onderwijs. Den Haag, 1985

External links
 Museon web site

Museums in The Hague
Science museums in the Netherlands
Natural history museums in the Netherlands
History museums in the Netherlands
Ethnographic museums in the Netherlands